The Farmable Wetlands Program is a wetlands conservation program in the United States. The Farm Service Agency (FSA) runs the program through the Conservation Reserve Program (CRP), with the goal of rehabilitation previously farmed wetlands.

Legislation

References

United States Department of Agriculture programs
Wetlands of the United States